Processo per direttissima is a 1974 Italian poliziottesco film. It stars actor Gabriele Ferzetti.

Cast
 Princess Ira von Fürstenberg as Cristina Visconti 
 Michele Placido as Stefano Baldini
Gabriele Ferzetti as Lawyer Finaldi
 Mario Adorf as Procuratore Benedikter
 Adalberto Maria Merli as Brigadiere Pendicò
 Zouzou as Laura, sister of Stefano
 Eros Pagni as Commissioner Antonelli
 Bernard Blier as the judge 	
 Omero Antonutti 	 	
 Luciano Bartoli

References

External links

1974 films
1970s Italian-language films
Poliziotteschi films
Courtroom films
Films scored by Stelvio Cipriani
1970s Italian films